The Roswell Independent School District is a public school district based in Roswell, New Mexico, United States.

In addition to Roswell, the district includes Midway.

History
In 2018 Ann Lynn McIlroy became superintendent.

2014 school shooting
On January 14, 2014, at about 8:10 am, a student opened fire inside the gymnasium of Berrendo Middle School. The suspect then surrendered to a staff member and was taken into police custody. A 12-year-old student and a 13-year-old student were both airlifted to a hospital in Lubbock, Texas, in critical condition. The suspected shooter was a seventh-grade 12-year-old student at the school named Mason Campbell, who used a shotgun that was smuggled into the school inside a duffle bag. Campbell is facing three counts of aggravated battery with a firearm, and can be confined in a juvenile detention facility until he turns 21 years old.

List of schools
The Roswell Independent School District has twenty-one schools, including twelve elementary schools, three middle schools, four high schools, a preschool. Early College High School and University High School are alternative schools. In addition, Sidney Gutierrez Middle Schools, a K–8 charter school, is chartered with the Roswell Independent School District.

References

Roswell, New Mexico
Education in Chaves County, New Mexico